George Bush Intercontinental Airport  is an international airport in Houston, Texas, United States, serving the Greater Houston metropolitan area. It is the busiest airport in Texas for international passenger traffic and number of international destinations, as well as being the second busiest airport in Texas overall, and the 12th busiest in the United States for total passenger traffic.

The airport, originally named Houston Intercontinental Airport, was later renamed after George H. W. Bush, the 41st president of the United States and resident of Houston, in 1997. Houston Intercontinental is one of the largest passenger hubs for United Airlines.

History

A group of Houston businessmen purchased the site for Bush Intercontinental Airport in 1957 to preserve it until the city of Houston could formulate a plan for a new airport as a replacement for William P. Hobby Airport (at the time known as Houston International Airport). The holding company for the land was named the Jet Era Ranch Corporation, but a typographical error transformed the words "Jet Era" into "Jetero" and the airport site subsequently became known as the Jetero airport site. Although the name Jetero was no longer used in official planning documents after 1961, the airport's eastern entrance was named Jetero Boulevard. Most of Jetero Boulevard was later renamed Will Clayton Parkway.

The City of Houston annexed the Intercontinental Airport area in 1965.

Houston Intercontinental Airport, which was the original name for the airport, opened in June 1969. The airport's IATA code of IAH derived from the stylization of the airport's name as "Intercontinental Airport of Houston." All scheduled passenger airline service formerly operated from William P. Hobby Airport moved to Intercontinental upon the airport's completion. Hobby remained open as a general aviation airport and was once again used for scheduled passenger airline jet service two years later when Southwest Airlines initiated intrastate airline service nonstop between Hobby and Dallas Love Field in 1971.

Houston Intercontinental had been scheduled to open in 1967, but design changes regarding the terminals created cost overruns and construction delays. The prime contractor, R.F. Ball Construction of San Antonio, sued the city of Houston for $11 million in damages, but assistant city attorney Joseph Guy Rollins Jr. defended the municipality on appeal to the Texas Supreme Court.

In the late 1980s, Houston City Council considered a plan to rename the airport after Mickey Leland—an African-American U.S. Congressman who died in an aviation accident in Ethiopia. Instead of renaming the whole airport, the city named Mickey Leland International Arrivals Building, which would later become Mickey Leland Terminal D, after the congressman. In April 1997, Houston City Council unanimously voted to rename the airport George Bush Intercontinental Airport/Houston, after George H. W. Bush, the 41st President of the United States. The name change took effect on May 2, 1997.

On August 28, 1990, Continental Airlines agreed to build its maintenance center at George Bush Intercontinental Airport; Continental agreed to do so because the city of Houston agreed to provide city-owned land near the airport.

As of 2007, Terminals A and B remain from the airport's original design. Lewis W. Cutrer Terminal C opened in 1981, the Mickey Leland International Arrivals Building (now called Terminal D) opened in May 1990, and the new Terminal E partially opened on June 3, 2003. The rest of Terminal E opened on January 7, 2004. Terminal D is the arrival point for all international flights except for United flights, which use Terminal E. Flights from Canada on Air Canada and WestJet arrive in terminal A. Terminal D also held customs and INS until the opening of the new Federal Inspection Service (FIS) building, completed on January 25, 2005.

Historical airline service: opening of Intercontinental in 1969 to the early 1980s
At the time of the opening of IAH in 1969, domestic scheduled passenger airline flights were being operated by American Airlines, Braniff International Airways, Continental Airlines, Delta Air Lines, Eastern Air Lines, National Airlines and Houston-based Texas International Airlines, which had formerly operated as Trans-Texas Airways. International flights at this time were being flown by Pan American World Airways with ten nonstop flights a week operated with Boeing 707 jetliners to Mexico City; KLM Royal Dutch Airlines operating Douglas DC-8 jets four days a week to Amsterdam via an intermediate stop in Montreal; Braniff International with Boeing 727 services several times a week to Panama City, Panama; and Aeronaves de Mexico (now Aeroméxico) flying Douglas DC-9 jets to Monterrey, Guadalajara, Puerto Vallarta, Acapulco and Mexico City several days a week. Texas International was also operating direct services to Mexico at this time with Douglas DC-9 jets to Monterrey and Convair 600 turboprop flights to Tampico and Veracruz. KLM introduced Boeing 747 services in 1971 and by 1974 Air France was operating four nonstop Boeing 747 flights a week to both Paris and Mexico City. Also in 1974, Continental, Pan Am, and National were operating McDonnell Douglas DC-10 wide body jetliners into IAH while Delta was flying Lockheed L-1011 TriStar wide body jets with both types being operated on respective domestic routes from the airport by these airlines; with National also operating Boeing 747s on a Miami–Houston–Los Angeles routing.

By the late 1970s, Cayman Airways had begun nonstop flights between Grand Cayman in the Caribbean and Intercontinental with BAC One-Eleven jets. Cayman Airways served the airport for many years, operating a variety of aircraft including Boeing 727-200, Boeing 737-200, Boeing 737-300, Boeing 737-400 and Douglas DC-8 jetliners into IAH in addition to the BAC One-Eleven. In 1977, British Caledonian, commenced non-stop flights between London's Gatwick Airport and Houston with Boeing 707 service, and later with DC-10 and Boeing 747-200 service. British Airways continued operating the route, when in December 1987, BA took over B-Cal increasing its frequency on the route to double-daily.

By July 1983, the number of domestic and international air carriers serving Intercontinental had grown substantially. American, Continental, Delta and Eastern had been joined by Piedmont Airlines, Southwest Airlines, TWA, United Airlines, USAir and Western Airlines. Western was operating daily McDonnell Douglas DC-10 wide body jet services nonstop to Salt Lake City at this time, with this flight also offering one-stop services to Anchorage, Alaska. International services were being operated by Air Canada, Aviateca, British Caledonian Airways, Continental Airlines, Eastern Air Lines, SAHSA, South African Airways, TACA, TWA and Viasa in addition to Pan Am, KLM, Air France, Aeroméxico and Cayman Airways. Several commuter and regional airlines were also operating passenger services at this time from IAH including Emerald Air (operating as Pan Am Express), Metro Airlines, Rio Airways and Royale Airlines. Metro Airlines was operating "cross-town" shuttle services with de Havilland Canada DHC-6 Twin Otter turboprops with up to seventeen round trip flights a day between IAH and the Clear Lake City STOLport located near the NASA Johnson Space Center and also up to nine round trip flights a day between the airport and Sugar Land Regional Airport as well as other flights to regional destinations in Texas and Louisiana. In addition, at this same time the airport had scheduled helicopter airline services operated by Executive Helicopters with Bell 206L LongRanger helicopters to four Houston-area heliports with up to 36 round trip flights a day.

Recent airline and airport developments: 2000 to the present day
As Houston was not an approved gateway for USA–London Heathrow flights under the Bermuda II Agreement, Continental Airlines and British Airways flew their London services to Gatwick Airport. British Airways, keen to allow its passengers access to connections at its larger Heathrow Airport hub, subsequently flew various routings from Houston to Heathrow, via a gateway approved technical stop, allowing its Houston originating flights to land at Heathrow. While keeping a daily Houston–Gatwick flight, British Airways operated a flight from Houston to Heathrow via Washington-Dulles, with the technical stop being later changed to Chicago-O'Hare and finally to Detroit. In March 2008, the Bermuda II agreement was replaced with the EU–US Open Skies Agreement, allowing Continental Airlines and British Airways to switch its London services from Houston to Heathrow Airport that summer. Currently, BA operates double-daily flights to London's Heathrow Airport with Boeing 777 and Boeing 787 service.

Other airlines that served Houston Intercontinental were Aviacsa, America West Airlines, Atlantic Southeast Airlines, Canadian Airlines, China Airlines, Comair, Grand Airways, Gulf Air, Korean Air, Martinair, Northwest Airlines, Pakistan International Airlines, PrivatAir (operating on behalf of KLM) and later SAS, Royal Jordanian (then called ALIA), SeaPort Airlines, South African Airways, UltrAir and World Airways.

On January 7, 2009, a Continental Airlines Boeing 737-800 departing Bush Intercontinental was the first U.S. commercial jet to fly on a mix of conventional jet fuel and biofuel.

In December 2009, the Houston City Council approved a plan to allow Midway Cos. to develop  of land owned by Houston Airport System (HAS) on the grounds of Bush Airport. Midway planned to develop a travel center for the airport's rental car facility. The city dictated the developer needed to place a convenience store and gas station facility, a flight information board, a fast casual restaurant, and a sit-down restaurant in the development.

In 2011, Continental Airlines began Boeing 777-200ER services to Lagos, Nigeria; this was the airport's first nonstop flight to the African continent. In May 2016, United ended the Houston–Lagos service citing the inability to repatriate revenue sold locally in Nigerian currency. South African Airways previously operated nonstop Boeing 747SP services in 1983 between Houston and Amilcar Cabral International Airport in the Cape Verde islands off the coast of Africa as a refueling stop for its flights between Houston and Johannesburg, South Africa. Continental was also planning to commence nonstop Boeing 787 services to Auckland in New Zealand but these plans were canceled as a reaction to new international flights at Hobby Airport announced by Southwest Airlines. United — which acquired Continental and had fully integrated it into the United brand by early 2012 — had postponed the introduction of this service owing to delays associated with the Boeing 787 Dreamliner. Its 787s were put to use on other international routes, however, including Houston–London and United's then-new Houston–Lagos nonstop flights. The Houston–Auckland nonstop route was then begun by Air New Zealand using a Boeing 777-200ER. In 2014, United added a second daily flight to Tokyo and new routes to Munich, Germany; Santiago, Chile; and Punta Cana, Dominican Republic, and it restarted the Aruba route, which had been canceled in 2012.

In August 2012, Lufthansa switched its daily Houston–Frankfurt route to an Airbus A380 from a Boeing 747-400, making Houston the first airport in Texas to receive A380 service. In addition, Lufthansa has also operated the Boeing 747-8 on the route. Dubai-based carrier Emirates has also operated the A380 on the Dubai-Houston route.

In 2014, Taiwan-based carrier EVA Air announced it would launch nonstop flights from Houston to Taipei on June 19, 2015. This began with three flights a week on the 777-300ER. The frequency was increased to four times a week starting July 1, 2015, and to six times a week starting March 28, 2016. EVA Air has made these flights daily since the end of 2016. This marks the first time nonstop flights are being operated between Taipei and any airport in Texas.

IAH became the first airport in North America to have nonstop flights to every inhabited continent in 2017, with the addition of Air New Zealand, but lost this claim when Atlas Air ended its nonstop flight to Luanda. The airport regained this status in December 2019 when Ethiopian Airlines launched service to Lomé in Togo and Addis Ababa in Ethiopia.

On September 7, 2017, United announced the launch of flights from Houston to Sydney, using a 787-9. Additionally, it surpassed Emirates' Dubai route as the longest flight at IAH.

In January 2019, Ethiopian Airlines became the latest international carrier to announce new service, three-times weekly, to Addis Ababa. The route will be Addis Ababa–Lome–Houston, and the airline is replacing its Los Angeles gateway for Houston. The route will be serviced using the Boeing 787 Dreamliner and will be the city's only gateway to Africa after service to Lagos, Nigeria, was canceled by United Airlines. Service was supposed to begin in June 2019, but was delayed until December 2019. Service began on December 16, 2019.

In October 2020, Southwest Airlines announced it would return to Bush airport for the first time since it stopped serving the airport in 2005. Service began in April 2021 with five nonstop destinations, augmenting the several dozen destinations it serves from Hobby airport.

On February 28, 2022, Caribbean Airlines announced a new international route to IAH. A seasonal flight from Georgetown, Guyana to Houston would be operated by their new Boeing 737 MAX aircraft.

On July 20, 2022, Spirit Airlines crew base plans were cleared. It was also announced that Spirit will bring 500 new jobs to the Houston Area. They added Bush airport as their tenth crew base and Focus city.

Future 
George Bush Intercontinental Airport is currently undergoing a $1.3 billion capital improvement program called the IAH Terminal Redevelopment Program (ITRP). The flagship project of this program is the construction of the Mickey Leland International Terminal (MLIT), which will consolidate what is today Terminal D and Terminal E into one centralized terminal including a shared ticketing, departure, and arrival hall. Terminal D will be extensively refurbished with a new concourse, Pier D West, being constructed. The ITRP should be complete by late 2024 or early 2025. Future expansion plans call for a Central D and East D pier to be built as passenger numbers grow, with the full project being capable of handling 33 million enplaned international passengers annually.

Facilities

Terminals

George Bush Intercontinental Airport has five terminals and 161 total gates, 131 with jet bridges and 30 hardstands. The Skyway automated people mover system provides airside connections between all five terminals. The Subway provides landside connections between the five terminals and the airport hotel. Terminals D & E have access to an international arrivals facility, and Terminal D has gates to support super jumbo jets including the Airbus A380 and Boeing 747-8.

Terminal A contains 20 gates.
Terminal B contains 40 gates, including 30 hardstands.
Terminal C contains 29 gates.
Terminal D contains 12 gates.
Terminal E contains 30 gates.

Ground transportation
From Downtown Houston one can travel to George Bush Intercontinental by taking Interstate 69/U.S. Route 59 (Eastex Freeway) to Beltway 8 or to Will Clayton Parkway, and access the airport from either road. From Downtown one could also take Interstate 45 (North Freeway), connect to Beltway 8, and enter the airport from the Beltway. The Hardy Toll Road has an exit from the north or south to the airport.

The Metropolitan Transit Authority of Harris County, Texas, or METRO, offers bus services available at the south side of Terminal C. The 102 Bush IAH Express serves the airport. Previously, METRO also operated an express bus service known as Airport Direct, launched in the summer of 2008, which traveled from Downtown Houston to Terminal C via the HOV lane of the Eastex Freeway (I-69)/(US 59). In 2010, in an effort to increase ridership and maximize revenue, METRO reduced the fare of Airport Direct and closed a dedicated passenger plaza for the service in Downtown Houston; instead, the bus stopped at several downtown hotels. The fare each way was reduced from $15 to $4.50. The fare change increased ridership levels but reduced cash flow. METRO consistently provided the service at an operational loss. However, in the summer of 2011, METRO announced it was discontinuing the Airport Direct service, while the Route 102 local service (which serves the greater Greenspoint business and residential district before traveling on I-45 to access downtown) continued to operate.

As of 2016 the Taiwanese airline EVA Air operates a shuttle bus service from Bush IAH to Richardson in the Dallas-Fort Worth area so DFW based customers may fly on its services to and from Houston. Previously China Airlines, also a Taiwanese carrier, provided a shuttle bus service to Sugar Land and the Southwest Houston Chinatown. It ended in 2008 when China Airlines ended its Houston passenger service.

Carriers provide scheduled bus and shuttle services to locations from IAH to NRG Park/NRG Astrodome, Downtown Houston, Uptown, Greenway Plaza, the Texas Medical Center, hotels in the Westchase and Energy Corridor business districts, the city of College Station and William P. Hobby Airport. Super Shuttle uses shared vans to provide services from George Bush Intercontinental Airport to the surrounding communities.

Artwork

Ed Carpenter's "Light Wings", a multicolored glass sculpture suspended below a skylight, adorns the Terminal A North Concourse. In Terminal A, South Concourse stands Terry Allen's "Countree Music." Allen's piece is a cast bronze tree that plays instrumental music by Joe Ely and David Byrne, though the music is normally turned off. The corridor leading to Terminal A displays Leamon Green's "Passing Through," a  etched glass wall depicting airport travelers.

The elevators in Terminal B are cased in stainless steel accordion shaped structures designed by Rachel Hecker. The corridor leading to Terminal B has Dixie Friend Gay's "Houston Bayou." This work is composed of an  Byzantine glass mosaic mural depicting scenes from Houston's bayous and wetlands, several bronze animals embedded in the floor, and five mosaic columns.

"Lights Spikes," designed by Jay Baker, was created for the 1990 G7 Summit when it was hosted by President George H. W. Bush in Houston. The sculpture was relocated to the airport outside E Terminal after the meetings, from its original location in front of the George R. Brown Convention Center. The columns lean at a ten-degree angle toward a central point that represents Houston. The distance between each "spike" and this point is relative to the distance between Houston and the capitals of the countries the flags represent. The countries represented are the United States, the United Kingdom, France, Japan, Canada, Italy and Germany, as well as the European community. The airport has a display of lighted modern sculptures between terminals C and D.

Radiant Fountains, LED-illuminated towers on JFK Boulevard, is the most prominent sculpture around the airport.

Other facilities
The airport houses an on-site hotel, a Marriott, between Terminals B and C and is accessible via the landslide inter-terminal train which runs every 3 minutes from 3:30 am to 12:30 am every day. The hotel has 573 rooms, one restaurant and bar, a concierge lounge, a coffee shop, health club, sundry shop and a conference center.

A VOR station, identified as IAH, is located on the airport property, south of runway 33L.

Airlines and destinations

Passenger

Cargo

Statistics

Top destinations

Airline market share

Annual traffic

Accidents and incidents
February 1, 1975: a Douglas DC-3 N15HC of Horizon Properties crashed on approach when the port wing collided with an electricity pylon. The aircraft was on a domestic non-scheduled passenger flight from Lawton Municipal Airport, Oklahoma, to Huntsville Regional Airport, Texas. The flight was diverted to Houston for weather. Of the 16 occupants, two crew and three passengers were killed.
August 23, 1990: a Grumman Gulfstream I operated by Rowan Drilling Company; power loss in an engine after take-off resulted in a failed attempt to regain altitude en route to New Orleans International Airport. The aircraft crashed on departure from Runway 15L and came to rest midfield along a parallel taxiway. There were three fatalities.
On September 11, 1991, Continental Express Flight 2574 was on descent to the airport when it suffered a structural failure because of improper maintenance, killing all 14 people on board.
February 19, 1996: a Continental Airlines McDonnell Douglas DC-9-32 operating as Continental Airlines Flight 1943 from Ronald Reagan National Airport arriving in Houston, Texas, landed with its landing gear in the stowed position on Runway 27. There were no fatalities and only minor injuries. The aircraft was written off.
Both occupants were killed.
All three crew members were killed.

References

External links

 Houston Airport System – Bush Intercontinental Airport
 Houston Airport System – Houston Airports Today television show
 

 
Airports established in 1969
Airports in Houston
Economy of Houston
Government of Houston
Memorials to George H. W. Bush